The 2007–2008 Israel Football League season was the inaugural season of the Israel Football League. The season concluded with the Jerusalem Lions defeating the Haifa Underdogs, 24–18 in overtime, in Israel Bowl I.

Regular season 
The regular season began on November 17, 2007, and consisted of a nine-game schedule, with each team playing the others three times throughout the season. The top three teams at the end of the regular season qualified for the playoffs.

Playoffs 
The Underdogs defeated the Pioneers in the semifinals and faced the Lions in Israel Bowl I, which took place on March 28, 2008, at Kraft Family Stadium. Moshe Horowitz earned Israel Bowl MVP honors for the champion Jerusalem Lions, who won in overtime 24–18.

  * Indicates overtime victory

Awards 

 Most Valuable Player: Moshe Horowitz, RB, Jerusalem Lions
 Most Improved Player: Erez "Shrek" Kaminski, OL, Haifa Underdogs

References 

Israel Football League Seasons